Robert Giese (born July 6, 1955, in Sioux City, Iowa) is a politician from the U.S. state of Nebraska.  A resident of South Sioux City, he served part of a term in the Nebraska Legislature.

Giese was mayor of South Sioux City.  In 2008, he was elected to represent the 17th Nebraska legislative district in the Legislature. He sat on the Education, Government, Military and Veterans Affairs, and State-Tribal Relations committees.  He resigned from his legislative seat after being elected Dakota County treasurer in 2010.

References

 

Living people
1955 births
Democratic Party Nebraska state senators
Politicians from Sioux City, Iowa
People from South Sioux City, Nebraska
Mayors of places in Nebraska